Gösta Werner (May 15, 1908 – July 20, 2009) was a Swedish film director. He was married to Kaj Björkdahl. He primarily made his mark on European cinema during the 1940s. During the 1970s, Werner was first associate professor at Stockholm University, and then later Professor of Cinematography. He was born in Östra Wemmenhög, Skåne, Sweden. Werner turned 101 years old on May 15, 2009.

Werner died in Stockholm on July 20, 2009. He was, at the time of his death, the world's oldest film director. He was seven months older than his successor, film director Manoel de Oliveira of Portugal.

Filmography
1998 - Spökskepp
1995 - Röda fläcken, Den
1981 - Victor Sjöström: Ett porträtt
1955 - Friarannonsen
1953 - Att döda ett barn
1952 - Encounter with Life 
1950 - Two Stories Up 
1949 - The Street
1948 - Loffe the Tramp 
1948 - Sunshine

Writer
1998 - Spökskepp
1938 - Kloka gubben
1939 - Svensson ordnar allt!

Assistant director
1931 - Skepparkärlek
1931 - Falska millionären

References

External links

100th Birthday Celebration (Swedish)
Obituary Dagens Nyheter  (Swedish)

1908 births
2009 deaths
People from Skurup Municipality
Swedish film directors
Swedish male screenwriters
Swedish centenarians
Academic staff of Stockholm University
20th-century Swedish screenwriters
20th-century Swedish male writers
Men centenarians